Marcelli is an Italian surname. Notable people with the surname include:

Abbondio Marcelli (1932–2015), Italian rower
Kyle Marcelli, (born 1990), Canadian racing driver
Nino Marcelli (1890–1967), Italian composer and conductor
Ulderico Marcelli (1882–1962), Italian composer and musician
Vittorio Marcelli (born 1944), former Italian road cyclist

See also
Giru Marcelli, a city and bishopric in Roman North Africa
:Category:Claudii Marcelli, members of the ancient Roman gens Claudius from the branch of Marcellus

Italian-language surnames